Tanya Helen Brady (24 January 1973 – 28 April 2022) was a British rower and Army captain.

Army career 
Brady rowed for the British Army when she served with the Royal Logistic Corps. As a soldier, she served in Bosnia.

Rowing career 
She was part of the British squad which competed in the 2005 World Rowing Championships, and won a bronze medal.

Death 
Brady died at Liss, Hampshire in April 2022. An inquest at Winchester Crown Court in January 2023 found that she was killed after being thrown from her horse which bolted.

References 

1973 births
2022 deaths
21st-century British women writers
Royal Logistic Corps soldiers
English female rowers
British female rowers
World Rowing Championships medalists for Great Britain
People from Hampshire
Deaths by horse-riding accident in England